Hale & Iremonger is an Australian independent publisher. It was founded in 1977 by Sylvia Hale, John Iremonger and Roger Barnes.

John left the company in 1980, moving to Allen & Unwin. By 2002, when Sylvia became involved in NSW state politics, some 500 books had been published on politics, urban history, women's studies and poetry.

In 2010 Hale & Iremonger's list was bought by Michael Rakusin, formerly of Tower Books.

Selected publications 
Books published by Hale & Iremonger include:

Nonfiction

Biography and autobiography

Poetry 

  Winner of the Grace Leven Prize for Poetry, 1985

Authors 
Other authors of books published by Hale & Iremonger include Doris Brett, Hazel Edwards, Ross Fitzgerald, Libby Gleeson, Robert Hughes, Grace Karskens, Mark O'Connor, Ron Pretty.

References 

1977 establishments in Australia
Book publishing companies of Australia